Dragoumis is a Greek surname. It may refer to:
 Ion Dragoumis (1878–1920), Greek diplomat, philosopher, writer and revolutionary
 Nikolaos Dragoumis (1874-1933), Greek painter, son of Stephanos Dragoumis
 Stefanos Dragoumis (1842–1923), Prime Minister of Greece

Greek-language surnames
Surnames